Carnikava (Livonian: Sarnikau, Zarnikau), previously Sānkaule, is a village and the center of the Carnikava parish of Ādaži Municipality in Latvia. It's located 25 km north from Riga at the mouth of the Gauja River. Carnikava had 4689 residents as of January 2020.

The village was first mentioned in Livonian Chronicle of Henry in 1211 as a summoning place of Livonian troops. Later Carnikava grew into a fishermen village, where in the 17th century the first breeding fishery and canned fish factory in the Russian Empire was built. Due to its proximity to the Baltic Sea, several forest lakes, the Gauja and annual fishermen and craftsmanship fairs, nowadays Carnikava is a popular summer resort among visitors from Riga.

A notable symbol and long-time specialty of Carnikava has been grilled lamprey, which is also pictured on the coat of arms of the municipality.

Heinz Christian Pander (1794-1865), researcher of biology, embryology and paleontology, lived and worked in Carnikava in his estate.

References

External links 
 Official tourism website

Villages in Latvia
Kreis Riga
Ādaži Municipality
Vidzeme